The Saint-Martinois Rally (RSM), formerly Movement for Justice and Prosperity (MJP) from 2016 to 2021 and Movement for the Advancement of the People (MAP) until 2016, is a Saint-Martinois political party, previously close to the Socialist Party until 2021.

History 
The party was created in 1996 by Louis Mussington, Alain Richardson and Sujah ​​Reiph.

The party won the most seats in the 2022 Saint Martin Territorial Council election.

See also 

 List of political parties in the Collectivity of Saint Martin

References 

Political parties established in 1996

Political parties in the Collectivity of Saint Martin